Paola Picotti (born 1977) is an Italian biologist who is Professor for Molecular Systems Biology at ETH Zürich. She is Deputy Head of the Institute for Molecular Systems Biology. Her research investigates how the conformational changes of proteins impact cellular networks. She was awarded the 2020 ETH Zürich Rössler Prize and the 2019 EMBO Gold Medal.

Early life and education 
Picotti grew up in Udine. Her mother was a mathematics teacher and her father worked in an electronics company. Picotti studied pharmaceutical chemistry at the University of Padua, and graduated in 2001. She then moved into biotechnology, working alongside Angelo Fontana on her doctoral research. She joined the laboratory of Ruedi Aebersold in the Institute for Molecular Systems Biology at ETH Zürich. She was appointed a scientific advisor at Aebersold's spin-out company Biognosys.

Research and career 
In 2011, Picotti was appointed to the faculty at ETH Zürich, first as an assistant professor and subsequently as an associate professor in molecular systems biology. In particular, Picotti works in proteomics, the large scale analysis of thousands of proteins at a given moment. Whilst proteomics offers the potential for wide-reaching analysis, detail is lost because of a lack of information about the specific proteins themselves.

Picotti pioneered the combination of limited proteolysis and mass spectrometry (so-called "LiP-MS"), which generates a structural barcode (a proteolytic fingerprint) for sentinel proteins. Sentinel proteins are proteins whose biological markers change depending on the activation state of a cellular process. By analysing literature for sentinels that were involved in diverse yeast pathways, Picotti identified a few hundred that she could measure using an assay. She has shown that this technique can be used to unravel the thermosensitivity of proteins, as well as used it to realise a map of protein-metabolite interactions. LiP-MS can monitor for the conformational change of proteins in complex environments, allowing for the visualisation of the dynamic 3D proteomes. She has since used LiP-MS to study protein aggregation in neurodegenerative disease.

Awards and honours 
 2014 The Analytical Scientist's Top 40 under 40
 2016 Human Proteome Organization Robert J. Cotter Award
 2017 Swiss Society for Molecular and Cellular Biosciences Friedrich-Miescher Award
 2018 European Proteomics Association Juan Pablo Albar Protein Pioneer Award
 2019 EMBO Gold Medal
 2019 European Research Council Consolidator Grant
 2020 Rössler Prize
 2020 Elected to the German National Academy of Sciences Leopoldina
 2021 Human Proteome Organization Discovery in Proteomics Award
 2021 Falling Walls Award for Life Sciences

Selected publications

References 

Living people
Italian molecular biologists
Academic staff of ETH Zurich
University of Padua alumni
1977 births
People from Udine
Italian women biologists